The Little Hawkeye Conference is a high school athletic conference in central Iowa. With Oskaloosa dropping from 4A to 3A for the 2010–11 school year, the conference now has only two 4A schools (Newton & Indianola). The majority of the membership is made up of only 3A schools, the second largest class of schools in Iowa. Although, Norwalk is on the verge of moving up to 4A.

Members

Grinnell will be joining the WaMaC Conference in 2023.

History
The conference was formed in 1983 by Norwalk, Clarke, Winterset and Saydel.

In 1988, the conference doubles, adding Perry, Carlisle, Johnston and Nevada.

In 1991, Perry and Saydel depart for the Raccoon River Conference, and Boone and Pella Christian join the conference.

Carlisle and Nevada left the conference after the 1995–96 school year for the Raccoon River Conference.  Clarke (Osceola) left the same year to join the reformed South Central Conference.  Grinnell, Knoxville and Pella were added from the South Central Conference after it folded after the 1995–96 school year.  (The Conference reformed with smaller schools the same year.)  Oskaloosa also applied for membership but was denied so they joined the Southeast 7.  

After the 1997–98 school year, Johnston left for the CIML, and Winterset left for the Raccoon River Conference.  Oskaloosa was added from the Southeast 7 Conference for the 1998–99 school year.  At the turn of the century, the Little Hawkeye Conference was an eight team league consisting of Boone, Grinnell, Knoxville, Norwalk, Oskaloosa, Pella, Pella Christian, and Waukee. 

For the 2006–07 school year, Waukee, who had recently moved up to 4A status and was one of Iowa's fastest growing school districts, left the league for the Central Iowa Metro League. They were replaced by Newton, whose recently resignation from the CIML had coincidentally opened the door for Waukee to join the conference. South Tama, formerly of the WaMaC Conference also joined the league that year, and the conference played with nine schools until Boone left in 2009 to join the Raccoon River Conference, a much better geographical fit for the school. South Tama left the conference for the North Iowa Cedar League in 2011.

Indianola High School explored the option of leaving the Central Iowa Metro League to join the league, however, in June 2010, the Indianola School Board voted unanimously to stay in the CIML. Indianola is still a 4A school, but is seeing its enrollment figures drop and is now the smallest school in the CIML.  In late 2012, Dallas Center–Grimes was admitted into the league as its eighth member for the 2013–14 school year. However, membership reverted to seven for the 2014–15 school year, as Knoxville moved to the South Central Conference. Indianola then joined the Conference from the CIML for the 2016–17 school year.  Grinnell will leaving for the WaMac Conference in the near future.

External links
Official site

References

High school sports in Iowa